Sugar Mama was originally produced by the James O. Welch Company in 1965, as a companion candy to the already-produced Sugar Babies and Sugar Daddy.  A Sugar Mama was a chocolate-covered caramel sucker, essentially a Sugar Daddy covered in chocolate. It had a distinctive red and yellow wrapper, the opposite of Sugar Daddy's yellow and red wrapper.

It has not been produced since the 1980s.

Tootsie Roll Industries brands
Products introduced in 1965
Sugar Family candy